Manuel Coppola (born 11 May 1982) is an Italian former footballer who played as a midfielder.

Career

Early career
Born in Rome, Lazio, Coppola started his professional career at Tivoli. In January 2004 he was signed by Messina, but spent the remainder of the season in Brindisi. In July 2004 he was exchanged with Marco Zoro, who already on loan at Messina. Messina also retained the 50% registration rights.

Genoa
In June 2005, Messina bought back Coppola and loaned him to Genoa. Coppola won promotion back to Serie B in 2006. In mid-2006 Coppola joined Genoa outright for undisclosed fee, while Messina got Antonio Ghomsi for free, Daniele De Vezze and Massimo Minetti. He won promotion to Serie A in 2006–07 Serie B. Coppola did not included in the club plan for the 2007–08 Serie A, which he only played once.

Siena
In January 2008, he moved to another Serie A club Siena in temporary deal, with option to buy half of the registration rights. In June 2008 Siena excised the option for €1.5 million. In July 2008 Siena also signed Abdelkader Ghezzal (for €3.5 million, Genoa bought him for €2 million in June) and bought back Fernando Forestieri for €4.5 million in June (was €1.7 million a year before). The deals effectively made Siena paid Genoa €500,000 cash and 50% registration rights of Forestieri to acquire 50% registration rights of Coppola and Ghezzal from Genoa and Genoa paid Crotone €2 million cash for Ghezzal.

Coppola only able to play 15 games in 2008–09 Serie A. In June 2009 Siena signed Coppola outright for another €1.5 million and also signed Gianluca Pegolo for €1 million (a year before a free agent). Co-currently, Siena sold Houssine Kharja to Genoa for €6.5 million. The deals, again effectively made Genoa acquired Kharja for €4 million cash plus 50% registration rights of Coppola and Pegolo. However Coppola was involved in another player swap.

Parma
Coppola moved to Parma on 1 July 2009 for €3 million (plus €250,000 other fee), in five-year contract. In June 2009 Parma also signed Daniele Galloppa (in co-ownership for €5M); Parma sold Francesco Parravicini (€2.5M ) and Reginaldo (50% rights for €2.5 million) to Siena in June. The deals, again effectively made Parma acquired 50% registration rights of Galloppa and full rights of Coppola for €3 million cash plus full rights of Parravicini and 50% registration rights of Reginaldo from Siena. (In 2011 Parma gave Ângelo to Siena for €2.5 million, who a year before a free agent, and another 50% of Reginaldo to Siena for €2.5 million, to acquire the remaining 50% of Galloppa for €5 million)

After not played for Parma in the first two games, On 28 August 2009, Coppola was loaned to Torino along with Julio César de León for free. Parma also signed Nicola Amoruso from Turin on the same day also for free. However Torino also received €250,000 as premi di valorizzazione for León's deal.

In summer 2010 Coppola left for U.S. Lecce in temporary deal for €400,000, however the loan contract also included a bonus deal that Parma paid Lecce €600,000 as premi di valorizzazione, effectively made Parma had to subsidy the loan deal for €200,000 cash.

In summer 2011 Coppola left for Empoli F.C. for €300,000 in temporary deal, co-currently Gianluca Musacci moved to Parma also in temporary deal for €300,000.

Siena return
In June 2012, he returned to Siena from Parma in co-ownership deal, however it was a financial success only.

Coppola wore no.5 shirt for Siena, however, Coppola again failed to adapt Serie A football even Siena was struggling in the bottom.

Cesena
In January 2013, he left for A.C. Cesena in temporary deal; the deal was extended on 4 July 2013. In June 2014 the co-ownership between Siena and Parma on Coppola was renewed again. On 15 July 2014, Siena officially expelled from Serie B due to financial difficulties, thus Coppola became a free agent. On 23 July 2014, Coppola signed a one-year contract with Serie A newcomer Cesena.

Catania
On 13 January 2015, Coppola was transferred to Serie B club Calcio Catania in a -year contract. Catania was relegated at the start of 2015–16 season due to match fixing scandal, thus Coppola left the club.

Ternana
On 27 August 2015, Coppolla was signed by Serie B club Ternana Calcio in a one-year deal.

Footnotes

References

External links

Living people
1982 births
Footballers from Rome
Association football midfielders
Italian footballers
Serie A players
Serie B players
Serie D players
U.S. Salernitana 1919 players
Genoa C.F.C. players
A.C.N. Siena 1904 players
Parma Calcio 1913 players
Torino F.C. players
U.S. Lecce players
Empoli F.C. players
A.C. Cesena players
Catania S.S.D. players
Ternana Calcio players